Chadbourn is a town in Columbus County, North Carolina, United States. The population was 1,856 at the 2010 census.

History
A post office called Chadbourn has been in operation since 1882. It was incorporated in 1883, being named after a local family engaged in the lumber industry.

Geography
Chadbourn is located at  (34.322374, -78.825823). The town lies within the Carolina Border Belt, a regional network of tobacco markets and warehouses along both sides of the North Carolina-South Carolina border.

Demographics

2020 census

As of the 2020 United States census, there were 1,574 people, 797 households, and 387 families residing in the town.

2000 census
At the 2000 census there were 2,129 people, 877 households, and 548 families in the town. The population density was 805.3 people per square mile (311.4/km). There were 983 housing units at an average density of 371.8 per square mile (143.8/km).  The racial makeup of the town was 53.55% African American, 41.94% White, 1.93% Native American, 0.38% Asian, 0.05% Pacific Islander, 1.41% from other races, and 0.75% from two or more races. Hispanic or Latino of any race were 1.97%.

Of the 877 households 27.6% had children under the age of 18 living with them, 35.3% were married couples living together, 24.4% had a female householder with no husband present, and 37.5% were non-families. 33.6% of households were one person and 14.3% were one person aged 65 or older. The average household size was 2.42 and the average family size was 3.12.

The age distribution was 28.4% under the age of 18, 9.0% from 18 to 24, 24.7% from 25 to 44, 22.5% from 45 to 64, and 15.4% 65 or older. The median age was 36 years. For every 100 females, there were 84.5 males. For every 100 females age 18 and over, there were 72.5 males.

The median household income was $24,539 and the median family income  was $30,574. Males had a median income of $23,804 versus $20,270 for females. The per capita income for the town was $12,290. About 24.3% of families and 31.4% of the population were below the poverty line, including 45.5% of those under age 18 and 25.6% of those age 65 or over.

Transportation
U.S. Route 76 passes through the northern part of the town. The old route of U.S. Route 74 passes east–west through Chadbourn. North Carolina Highway 410 moves north–south through the town.

Until 1955, the town was a transfer point for Atlantic Coast Line Railroad passenger trains to Myrtle Beach, South Carolina. At Chadbourn, connections could be made to trains bound for Florence, South Carolina, Sumter, South Carolina and Columbia's Union Station, Augusta, Georgia's Union Station to the west, and Wilmington to the east. The final passenger train through the town's station was the passenger train on an Augusta - Sumter - Florence - Chadbourn - Wilmington itinerary. Its final service was in 1965 or 1966, the station taking freight only station by late 1966.

References

Works cited

External links
 Official website

Towns in North Carolina
Towns in Columbus County, North Carolina